Oscar Enrique Paris Mancilla (born 3 September 1948) is a Chilean physician and politician who served as Minister of Health.

References

Living people
1948 births
Chilean Ministers of Health
Pontifical Catholic University of Chile alumni
People from Puerto Montt
Chilean gay men
Chilean LGBT politicians
Gay politicians